Born Like This is the sixth and final solo studio album by British-American rapper/producer MF DOOM. It was released under the pseudonym "DOOM" on March 24, 2009 through Lex Records. It debuted at number 52 on the Billboard 200 chart, having sold 10,895 copies as of March 29, 2009. In addition to tracks produced by MF Doom, the album includes production by frequent collaborator Madlib, as well as J Dilla. The album title is borrowed from Charles Bukowski's poem "Dinosauria, We", which employs it as a cadence. The track "Cellz" opens with a sampled recording of Bukowski reading the poem.

Critical reception

At Metacritic, which assigns a weighted average score out of 100 to reviews from mainstream critics, Born Like This received an average score of 77% based on 21 reviews, indicating "generally favorable reviews".

Born Like This ranked at number 4 on The Skinnys "2009: A Year in Records" list. Pitchfork included it in their best albums of 2009, placing it at number 48.

Track listing

Sample credits and additional notes
"Gazzillion Ear" samples "Trouble" (performed) by Brenton Wood and "Theme from Midnight Express" by Giorgio Moroder. The instrumental track for "Gazzillion Ear" is also based on "Dig It" and "Phantom of the Synths", both by J Dilla.
"Yessir!" samples "UFO" by ESG. 
"Absolutely" samples a Horn section from "Creep" by TLC. It also uses a vocal sample from "Sun Goddess" by Ramsey Lewis.
"Lightworks" samples "Lightworks" by Raymond Scott. 
Instrumental track for "Lightworks" is also based on J Dilla's version of "Lightworks", from the album Donuts.
"Angelz" was recorded in 2006.
"Cellz" samples "Dinosora, We" by Charles Bukowski.
"Cellz" is split into two tracks: "Cellz, Pt.1" and "Cellz, Pt.2" on the redux version.
"That's That" samples "Princess Gika" by Galt MacDermot; it also contains dialog excerpts from the film Who Framed Roger Rabbit, performed by Christopher Lloyd.

Personnel
Mr. Chop – additional instruments 
Paloma Faith (aka “Cat-Girl”) – additional vocals 
G Koop – keyboards, guitar, bass 
Posdnuos (aka P-Pain) – additional vocals 
Prince Paul (aka Filthy Pablo) – additional vocals 
Raekwon – additional vocals

Charts

References

External links
 

2009 albums
MF Doom albums
Albums produced by J Dilla
Albums produced by Jake One
Albums produced by Madlib